Pellicano may refer to:

 Pellicano (surname)
 CVV-4 Pellicano, Italian glider designed for a competition to select an aircraft for the 1940 Olympic Games
 Italian ship Pellicano, multiple ships